Nieuw-Loosdrecht is a village in the province of North Holland, Netherlands. It is a part of the town of Loosdrecht and the municipality of Wijdemeren. It lies about 4 km west of Hilversum.

The village was first mentioned in 1415 as "optie aeker, dair nu die Zypkerc op staet". The current name means "new ferry over the drainage canal". Nieuw (new) has been added to distinguish from Oud-Loosdrecht.

The Dutch Reformed Sijpe Church has built in 1400. Castle museum Sypesteyn has built 1911 and 1926 as a replica of the 1568 castle. The museum contains a large art collection. The castle is surrounded by a 17th century park.

Gallery

References

Populated places in North Holland
Wijdemeren